Robert Debré (7 December 1882 – 29 April 1978) was a French physician (pediatrician) at Necker-Enfants Malades Hospital in Paris.

The largest pediatric hospital in Paris, l'Hôpital Robert-Debré - located in the North-East part of Paris (19th arrondissement) - is named after him.

Debré was born in Sedan, Ardennes. A member of the Académie de Médecine, he was a colleague and close friend of professors Jean Quenu and Albert Besson, who in 1950 identified cats to be the natural reservoir of the Cat scratch disease.

He is the father and grandfather of influential French government ministers; see Debré family.

In 1946, he wrote with Prof. Paul Rohmer a famous manual entitled "Traité de Pathologie Infantile" (2500 pages, 2 volumes) which became a reference for a whole generation of pediatricians.

References

See also 
 Debré

1882 births
1978 deaths
People from Sedan, Ardennes
French pediatricians
French people of Jewish descent
Members of the French Academy of Sciences
Léon Bernard Foundation Prize laureates